Ladakh Football Association (LFA) is the state governing body of football in Ladakh, India. It is affiliated with the All India Football Federation, the national governing body.

References

Football governing bodies in India
2019 establishments in Ladakh
Sports organizations established in 2019
Football in Ladakh